Florence Robinson (4 October 2001) is an English rugby union player. Known as Flo, she plays for Exeter Chiefs women's team domestically and is a member of England's 2021 Six Nations Championship squad .

International career 
Having played for the U20s side, Robinson was called up to the senior England squad in March 2021. She was one of six development players for the side during the 2021 Women's Six Nations Championship.

Robinson has also played for the England U18s 7s side, competing in the U18s Rugby Europe competition in 2019.

Club career 
Robinson plays for Exeter Chiefs as a scrum half. She joined the club from Pulborough RFC.

Early life and education 
Her sister, Emily Robinson, plays for Harlequins Women and was also named to the England squad for the 2021 Women's Six Nations.

As well as playing rugby, Robinson is studying for a degree at the University of Exeter.

References 

2001 births
Living people
England women's international rugby union players
English female rugby union players
Rugby union players from Brighton